Ebergar (also Everger) (died June 11, 999) was the Archbishop of Cologne, Germany, from 984 to 999.

Biography
Ebergar's origins are not known. Before becoming Archbishop, Ebergar was a member of the Cathedral Chapter.

Ebergar became the Archbishop of Cologne in 984. In 988 the Lord of Rodenkirchen gave to Cologne the Abbacy of St. Martin. In 991 he organised the funeral of the Empress Theophanu.

He died on 11 June 999 and was buried in the Cathedral of Cologne.

References

10th-century births
999 deaths
Year of birth unknown
Archbishops of Cologne
10th-century archbishops
Burials at Cologne Cathedral